Megève Altiport is an altiport  southeast of Megève, a commune in the Haute-Savoie department of the Rhône-Alpes region in eastern France.

Facilities 

References

External links 
 

Airports in Auvergne-Rhône-Alpes
Buildings and structures in Haute-Savoie
Altiports